Olimpo may refer to:

Olimpo de Bahía Blanca, Argentine sports club located in Bahía Blanca, Argentina
Olympus (Euboea), name for Mount Olympus
Olympos, Larissa, municipality in Greece

See also
Fuerte Olimpo, city in Paraguay